Christmas with Friends may refer to:

Christmas with Friends (India.Arie and Joe Sample album), 2015
Christmas with Friends (Måns Zelmerlöw album), 2010